The 6th New York Infantry Regiment, also called "Wilson's Zouaves", was a unit of the Union Army during the American Civil War. It was organized at New York City on May 25, 1861. The Regiment was composed of 5 initial companies of A, B, C, and D. Companies E, F, G, H, I, and K were added May 25, 1861. It was made up primarily of gang members, ex-cons, and criminals from the Bowery section of New York City. Rumor had it that a man had to prove he'd served time in jail before he was allowed to join.

Santa Rosa Island 
From June 15 through June 23, 1861, the regiment left New York state and moved to Santa Rosa Island, Florida, where they were attached to:
 Santa Rosa Island, District of Florida, Department of the South, to May 1862.
 Arnold's Brigade, District of Pensacola, Florida, Department of the South, to September 1862. *Wilson's Brigade, District of West Florida, Department of the Gulf, to November 1862.
 Grover's Division, Department of the Gulf, to January 1863.
 1st Brigade, 4th Division, 19th Army Corps, Dept. of the Gulf, to June 1863.

Engagements 
 October 9, 1861 - against Confederate forces led by Gen. Richard H. Anderson in the Battle of Santa Rosa Island.
 November 22–23 - against Confederate works at Pensacola.
 January 1, 1862 - bombardment of Fort McRae and Fort Barrancas.
 March 27–31, 1862 - reconnaissance on Santa Rosa Island.
 May 9 through November 1862 - Co. "K" on duty at Pensacola.
 June 14-14 - Companies B, C E and H on expedition to Milton, Florida.
 August 7–10 - reconnaissance from Pensacola to Bagdad, Florida and Milton, Florida
 November 1862 - companies A and E ordered to New Orleans, Louisiana.
 December 17-March 13, 1863 - occupation of Baton Rouge, Louisiana.
 March 13–27, 1863 - operations at the Siege of Port Hudson.
 March 28, 1863 - moved to Donaldsonville, Louisiana.
 April 9-May 14, 1863 - operations in Western Louisiana.
 April 11–20 - Teche Campaign.
 April 12–13 - Fort Bisland
 April 13 — Porter's and McWilliams' Plantations at Indian Bend, Louisiana.
 April 14 — Battle of Irish Bend.
 April 17 — Battle of Vermillion Bayou.
 April 20 — Opelousas, Louisiana.
 May 11, 1863, moved to Barre Landing then May 21–26, 1863, by trains to Berwick, Louisiana.
 May 25, 1863, action at Franklin and Centreville.

Mustered out 
The 6th was ordered back to New York City for muster out, mustered out at New York City June 25, 1863, expiration of term.

See also 
 List of New York Civil War regiments

References

Further reading 
 Morris, Gouverneur. The history of a volunteer regiment : being a succinct account of the organization, services and adventures of the Sixth Regiment New York Volunteers Infantry known as Wilson Zouaves: where they went, what they did, and what they saw in the War of the Rebellion, 1861 to 1865. New York, 1891.

External links 
 New York State Military Museum and Veterans Research Center - Civil War - 6th Infantry Regiment History, photograph, table of battles and casualties, Civil War newspaper clippings, historical sketch, and battle flag for the 6th New York Infantry Regiment.

Infantry 006
1861 establishments in New York (state)
Military units and formations established in 1861
Military units and formations disestablished in 1863